Patrick Zeferino Costinha (born 13 May 1994) is a Portuguese footballer  who plays as a goalkeeper.

Football career
On 21 January 2018, Costinha made his professional debut with Real in a 2017–18 LigaPro match against União Madeira.

References

External links

1994 births
Living people
Portuguese footballers
Association football goalkeepers
Liga Portugal 2 players
Segunda Divisão players
Amarante F.C. players
C.D. Cova da Piedade players
Real S.C. players
Amora F.C. players
C.D. Pinhalnovense players